Vasalemma is a small borough in Harju County, northwestern Estonia. As of 2011 Census, the settlement's population was 879, of which the Estonians were 711 (80.9%).

Vasalemma has a station on the Elron western route.

Vasalemma Manor
Vasalemma estate was founded in 1825 and in 1890-93 the present manor house was erected by Baltic German landowner Eduard von Baggehufwudt. The architect was Konstantin Wilcken, who designed the house in a bare limestone neo-Gothic style. Several interior details have survived from this period, such as wainscoting, coffered ceilings and pig-iron ovens.

References

External links

Vasalemma Parish 
Vasalemma manor on Estonian Manors Portal

Boroughs and small boroughs in Estonia
Kreis Harrien
Manor houses in Estonia